Nellie Murray (1835-1918) was a caterer specializing in Creole cuisine who was born enslaved in New Orleans and became internationally recognized after her appearance cooking at the 1893 Chicago World Fair.

Early life 
Murray was born in 1835 to parents enslaved by the governor of Louisiana, Paul Octave Hébert. Her mother and grandmother were both cooks living on Hébert's Bayou Goula plantation, and Murray learned to cook from them.

Career and impact 
After Reconstruction Murray created a catering business serving the elite of New Orleans.

Murray gained celebrity status after she served as Chef de Cuisine at the Louisiana Mansion Club at the1893  Chicago World Fair. The Times-Democrat, referring to her appearance there, called her "the celebrated cook". According to historian Zella Palmer of Dillard University, as a result of her work at the fair, Murray "became an instant celebrity and society ladies in Chicago, New York, Paris and New Orleans booked her months in advance."

The Daily Picayune in 1894 wrote, "Do you know Nellie Murray? To admit that you do not is confession that you are not a member of the New Orleans Four Hundred." The paper called her the "Queen of New Orleans Creole Cuisine". She made a world tour in the late 19th century.

According to Palmer, by the time of her death Murray had "gained legendary status worldwide". Palmer called Murray "the most famed caterer of elite New Orleans society". 

Murray spoke out against the New Orleans laws segregating street cars.

Personal life 
The 1890 census lists Murray as living on Polymnia Street. She lived for varying lengths of time in Berlin, Bucharest, Paris, Rome, and Vienna.

Murray had children. She died in 1918 at the age of 82.

References 

American women chefs
African-American chefs
American freedmen
1835 births
1918 deaths
People from New Orleans
19th-century American businesswomen
19th-century American businesspeople